Graffenstaden station (French: Gare de Graffenstaden) is a railway station serving the industrial zone of Geispolsheim, close to the commune of Illkirch-Graffenstaden, Bas-Rhin department, France. The station is owned and operated by SNCF, in the TER Grand Est regional rail network and is served by TER trains.

References 

Railway stations in Bas-Rhin